Jacksonville is a city in Onslow County, North Carolina, United States. As of the 2020 census, the population was 72,723, which makes Jacksonville the 14th-largest city in North Carolina. Jacksonville is the county seat and most populous community of Onslow County, which is coterminous with the Jacksonville, North Carolina metropolitan area. Demographically, Jacksonville is the youngest city in the United States, with an average age of 22.8 years old, which can be attributed to the large military presence. The low age may also be in part due to the population drastically going up over the past 80 years, from 783 in the 1930 census to 72,876 in the 2021 Census estimate.

It is the home of the United States Marine Corps' Camp Lejeune and New River Air Station. Jacksonville is located adjacent to North Carolina's Crystal Coast area.

History
After the end of the Tuscarora wars in 1713 and the forced removal of Native American tribes was followed by permanent settlement of the regions between New Bern and Wilmington. The New River became a major production center for naval stores like turpentine.  The downtown waterfront park is built on the site original site of Wantland's Ferry.

In 1752, a devastating hurricane destroyed the county seat of Johnston, and Wantlands Ferry, located further up the New River, at the present site of Jacksonville, was chosen as the site of the new county courthouse. The area was later known as Onslow Courthouse. In 1842, the town was incorporated and renamed Jacksonville in honor of former U.S. President Andrew Jackson.  The town was briefly captured and occupied in November 1862 by a raiding party led by U.S. Navy Lt. William B. Cushing.

Jacksonville and Onslow County continued to rely on naval stores, lumber, and tobacco crops for industry. In 1939, Colonel George W. Gillette of the U.S. Army Corps of Engineers surveyed and mapped the area from Fort Monroe, Virginia to Fort Sumter, South Carolina which included the Onslow County coastline and the New River. The map is believed to have fostered the interest of the War and Navy Departments in establishing an amphibious training base in the area. Congressman Graham Arthur Barden of New Bern lobbied Congress to appropriate funds for the purchase of about  along the eastern bank of the New River. The establishment in 1941 of Marine Barracks, New River, later renamed Camp Lejeune Marine Corps Base, led to the relocation of 700 families. While the landowners were compensated, many of the families displaced were sharecroppers who did not own the land on which their houses were built, and did not receive compensation for their structures. Some African American families were able to purchase property from Raymond Kellum and established the community of Kellumtown. Other displaced families established communities in Georgetown, Pickettown, Bell Fork, and Sandy Run. The latter communities have since been absorbed by Jacksonville. Colonel Gillette had planned to retire near the small village of Marine, ironically named after a local family whose surname was Marine, but lost his land to the acquisition, as well.

Construction of Camp Lejeune caused a population explosion in the small town of about 800 inhabitants, as new workers migrated to the area. Growth continued to be fueled by both young Marine families and military retirees. Today, Jacksonville's primary industry is retail sales and services. The primary migration draw continues to be the U.S. Marine Corps.

The Bank of Onslow and Jacksonville Masonic Temple, Mill Avenue Historic District, and Pelletier House and Wantland Spring are listed on the National Register of Historic Places.

In 2016, Jacksonville became the first jurisdiction to adopt a paid holiday honoring the 13th Amendment to the United States Constitution, which made slavery in the United States and its territories illegal.  The resolution of adoption mentions "the prevention of the modern slavery" which it describes as "human trafficking", including child labor and military service.

Geography

It is about 60 minutes from Wilmington and 15 minutes from the Intracoastal Waterway.

Three public golf courses provide recreation for those who reside in or visit Jacksonville: Rock Creek, Swingin' Things, and Paradise Point (located aboard MCB Camp Lejeune).

Climate

Demographics

2020 census

As of the 2020 United States census, 72,723 people, 21,986 households, and 15,491 families resided in the city.

2000 census
As of the census of 2000, 66,715 people, 17,175 households, and 13,533 families resided in the city. The population density was 1,500.0 people per square mile (579.1/km). The 18,312 housing units averaged 411.7 per square mile (159.0/km). The racial composition of the city was 63.94% White, 23.96% African American, 2.07% Asian, 0.75% Native American, 0.19%  Pacific Islander, 5.42% some other race, and 3.67% two or more races.  

Of the 17,175 households, 49.5% had children under the age of 18 living with them, 63.8% were married couples living together, 12.3% had a female householder with no husband present, and 21.2% were not families. About 16.6% of all households were made up of individuals, and 5.1% had someone living alone who was 65 years of age or older. The average household size was 2.83 and the average family size was 3.8

In the city, the population was distributed as 24.3% under 18, 36.3% from 18 to 24, 25.9% from 25 to 44, 8.8% from 45 to 64, and 4.8% who were 65 or older. The median age was 22 years. Jacksonville has been named the youngest city in the nation (lowest median age) on various lists.  For every 100 females, there were 156.2 males. For every 100 females 18 and over, there were 178.6 males.

The median income for a household in the city was $32,544, and for a family was $33,763. Males had a median income of $17,121 versus $19,931 for females. The per capita income for the city was $14,237. About 12.5% of families and 14.1% of the population were below the poverty line, including 18.0% of those under age 18 and 17.7% of those age 65 or over.

Economy

Top employers

According to the city's 2012 Comprehensive Annual Financial Report, the top employers in the city are:

Law and government
The current mayor of Jacksonville is Sammy Phillips.

City council
 Brian H Jackson (ward 1)
 Jerry Bitner (ward 2)
 Michael Lazzara (ward 3 and mayor pro tem)
 Angelia Washington (ward 4)
 Randy Thomas (representative at-large)
 Robert Warden (representative at-large)

The current postmaster of Jacksonville is Jamie Thompson.

Education

Public schools
Onslow County Schools serves the city, except for Marine Corps Air Station New River, which, along with Camp Lejeune, is served by Department of Defense Education Activity (DoDEA) schools.

Alternative school
Onslow County Learning Center

Elementary schools
 Bell Fork Elementary School
 Blue Creek Elementary School
 Carolina Forest Elementary School
 Clyde Erwin Elementary School
 Hunters Creek Elementary School
 Jacksonville Commons Elementary School
 MeadowView Elementary School
 Morton Elementary School
 Northwoods Elementary School
 Parkwood Elementary School
 Silverdale Elementary School
 Southwest Elementary School
 Stateside Elementary School
 Summersill Elementary School
 Thompson Elementary School
 Dixon Elementary School

Middle schools
 Dixon Middle School
 Hunters Creek Middle School
 Jacksonville Commons Middle School
 Northwoods Park Middle School
 New Bridge Middle School
 Southwest Middle School

High schools
 Dixon High School
 Jacksonville High School
 Northside High School
 Richlands High School
 Southwest High School
 White Oak High School
 Swansboro High School

MCAS New River is zoned to Delalio Elementary School in MCAS New River and Brewster Middle School and Lejeune High School in Camp Lejeune.

Private schools
 Fellowship Christian Academy
 Grace Baptist School
 Infant Of Prague Catholic School
 Jacksonville Christian Academy
 Living Water Christian School
 Montessori Children's School
 St. Anne's Day School
 Shiloh Institute of Learning
 One World Montessori School

Public magnet schools
 Clyde Erwin Elementary School (year round school)
 New Bridge Middle School
 Northwoods Elementary School (year round school)
 Onslow Virtual Secondary School

Higher education
 Coastal Carolina Community College
 Miller-Motte Technical College - Jacksonville branch
 University of Mount Olive - Jacksonville branch

Charter school
 ZECA School of  Arts and Technology

Transportation
In 2009, the Jacksonville metropolitan statistical area ranked as the ninth-highest in the United States for ratio of commuters who walked to work (8.1%).

Notable people
 David Charles Abell, conductor (born in Jacksonville)
 Ryan Adams, singer-songwriter, who frequently makes reference to Jacksonville in his songs 
 Jones Angell, play-by-play announcer for the North Carolina Tar Heels
 Troy Barnett, former NFL defensive lineman
 Art Bell, talk radio host
 David Braxton, former NFL player
 Levi Brown, former NFL offensive tackle
 Burke Day, Georgia state legislator and businessman
 Edward B. Dudley, governor, congressman
 Dave Dunaway, former NFL player
 Jacob Evans, NBA player
 Chad Fonville, former MLB player for the Montreal Expos, Los Angeles Dodgers, Chicago White Sox, and Boston Red Sox
 Mike Frier, former NFL player for the Cincinnati Bengals and Seattle Seahawks
 David Green, former NFL and CFL player
 Sara Hickman, singer
 Marcus Jones, former NFL player for the Tampa Bay Buccaneers
 Christina Koch, engineer and NASA astronaut
 Qasim Mitchell, former NFL player
 Quincy Monk, former NFL player
 Donte Paige-Moss, former AFL player
 Michael R. Nelson, former mayor of Carrboro and first openly gay mayor in North Carolina
 Dian Parkinson, television personality and model
 Danielle Peck, singer
 Andre Purvis, former NFL player for the Cincinnati Bengals
 A.J. Styles, professional wrestler
 Tyrone Willingham, former head football coach at University of Washington and the University of Notre Dame

See also 

 List of municipalities in North Carolina

References

Further reading
 Murrell, Stratton C. and Billie Jean. Images of America: Jacksonville and Camp Lejeune, Arcadia Publishing, 2001. 
 Watson, Alan D. Onslow County: A Brief History Division of Archives and History, North Carolina Department of Cultural Resources, Raleigh, 1995. 
 On Cushing's raid: http://civilwarnavy150.blogspot.com/2012/11/enter-commando-cushings-raid-on.html

External links

 
 
 Jacksonville Daily News Website

 
Populated places established in 1757
Cities in North Carolina
County seats in North Carolina
Cities in Onslow County, North Carolina
1757 establishments in the Thirteen Colonies
Populated coastal places in North Carolina